Crematogaster castanea is a species of ant in tribe Crematogastrini. It was described by Smith in 1858.

Subspecies
There are 20 named subspecies:

References

castanea
Insects described in 1858